Doomsday Afternoon is the sixth studio album by American musician Phideaux Xavier, and the second part of his projected "Trilogy" of albums dealing with "Big Brother" authoritarianism and ecological crisis, after part one, The Great Leap. It features more elaborate progressive rock song structures, similar to Chupacabras and his next two albums. To date, this is his most well known and critically acclaimed album, and Phideaux Xavier considers it to be his "masterpiece".

Track listing

Act One
"Micro Softdeathstar" - 11:17
"The Doctrine of Eternal Ice (Part One)" - 3:01
"Candybrain" - 4:06
"Crumble" - 2:55
"The Doctrine of Eternal Ice (Part Two)" - 8:08

Act Two
"Thank You for the Evil" - 9:18
"A Wasteland of Memories" - 2:22
"Crumble" - 2:55
"Formaldehyde" - 8:17
"Microdeath Softstar" - 14:40

Personnel
Rich Hutchins – drums
Ariel Farber – vocals, handclaps
Valerie Gracious – piano, vocals
Mathew Kennedy – bass guitar
Gabriel Moffat – lap steel guitar, solo & electric guitar, textures, treatments, transitions
Linda Ruttan Moldawsky – vocals
Molly Ruttan – vocals
Mark Sherkus – hammond B3, minimoog, ARP string ensemble, korg KARMA, sampler
Phideaux Xavier – piano, rhodes, moog voyager, 6 & 12 string guitar, vocals

References

Phideaux Xavier albums
2007 albums